

Ion Buga (born February 16, 1935) is a Moldovan politician and history professor.

Biography 

He served as member of the Parliament of Moldova in 1990s and president of the party  New Historical Option (then called Romanian National Party) after 2000.

He is a leader of the Democratic Forum of Romanians in Moldova.

Ion Buga is one of the 278 signatories to the Declaration of Independence of the Republic of Moldova.

Distinctions and decorations
 Order of the Republic (2012)
 The "Civic Merit" Medal (1996)

Note

External links 
 Ion BUGA
 Declaraţia de Independenţă revizuită
 Cine au fost şi ce fac deputaţii primului Parlament din R. Moldova (1990-1994)?
 Declaraţia deputaţilor din primul Parlament

Romanian people of Moldovan descent
Living people
1935 births
20th-century Moldovan historians
Moldovan MPs 1990–1994
Popular Front of Moldova MPs
Deputy Presidents of the Moldovan Parliament